Luiz Paulo Daniel Barbosa (born 29 November 1987), commonly known as Pitty, is a Brazilian footballer who plays as a center back.

Career
He formerly played for Camisa, Taubaté, Anápolis, Monte Azul, Vila Nova, Treze, Novembro, Rio Claro, Guarani, São Bento, Paraná, Cuiabá, Al-Batin, Al-Tai, Al-Jabalain, and Al-Shoulla.

References

1987 births
Living people
Brazilian footballers
Brazilian expatriate footballers
Esporte Clube Taubaté players
Anápolis Futebol Clube players
Atlético Monte Azul players
Vila Nova Futebol Clube players
Treze Futebol Clube players
Esporte Clube XV de Novembro (Piracicaba) players
Rio Claro Futebol Clube players
Guarani FC players
Esporte Clube São Bento players
Paraná Clube players
Cuiabá Esporte Clube players
Al Batin FC players
Al-Tai FC players
Al-Jabalain FC players
Al-Shoulla FC players
Campeonato Brasileiro Série B players
Campeonato Brasileiro Série C players
Saudi Professional League players
Saudi First Division League players
Expatriate footballers in Saudi Arabia
Brazilian expatriate sportspeople in Saudi Arabia
Association football defenders
People from São José dos Campos
Footballers from São Paulo (state)